American rapper, singer, and record producer Jon Bellion has released 2 studio albums, 4 mixtapes, 16 singles, and 18 music videos. He has also composed songs for artists including Eminem, Justin Bieber, Jason Derulo, CeeLo Green, Lauv, Halsey, Camila Cabello, Selena Gomez and MAX, and has been a featured artist on tracks by Logic, Sylvan LaCue, B.o.B, Zedd, and Illenium.

Albums

Studio albums

Notes

Mixtapes

Singles

As lead artist

As featured artist

Guest appearances

Music videos
 "Claps and Autotunes for Lovers"
 "Without Your Face"
 "Come Back Down"
 "Shadows"
 "Bad For My Health"
 "New York Soul"
 "Jim Morrison"
 "LIFE"
 "The Wonder Years"
 "Paper Planes"
 "One More Time"
 "Ungrateful Eyes"
 "Dead Man Walking"
 "Simple and Sweet"
 "Luxury"
 "Carry Your Throne"
 "Guillotine"
 "All Time Low"
 "Stupid Deep"
 "Good Things Fall Apart"

Production and writing credits

Notes

References

External links
 
 
 
 

Discographies of American artists
Hip hop discographies
Pop music discographies